In Greek mythology, the name Mytilene (Ancient Greek: Μυτιλήνη) may refer to one of the following figures, all of whom are counted among possible eponyms of the city Mytilene:

Mytilene, sister of the Amazon Myrina. She took part in her sister's campaign and had the city named after her.
Mytilene, a princess as a daughter of King Macareus of Lesbos or of the Pisatian king Pelops. She was the mother of Myton by Poseidon. As daughter of Macareus, Mytilene was the sister of Agamede, Antissa, Arisbe, Issa and Methymna all are eponyms also of the cities at Lesbos. Her brothers were Cydrolaus, Neandrus, Leucippus and Eresus.

Other mythical eponyms of Mytilene include the aforementioned Myton and an inhabitant of the city named Mytilus.

Notes

References 

 Diodorus Siculus, The Library of History translated by Charles Henry Oldfather. Twelve volumes. Loeb Classical Library. Cambridge, Massachusetts: Harvard University Press; London: William Heinemann, Ltd. 1989. Vol. 3. Books 4.59–8. Online version at Bill Thayer's Web Site
 Diodorus Siculus, Bibliotheca Historica. Vol 1-2. Immanel Bekker. Ludwig Dindorf. Friedrich Vogel. in aedibus B. G. Teubneri. Leipzig. 1888-1890. Greek text available at the Perseus Digital Library.
 Stephanus of Byzantium, Stephani Byzantii Ethnicorum quae supersunt, edited by August Meineike (1790-1870), published 1849. A few entries from this important ancient handbook of place names have been translated by Brady Kiesling. Online version at the Topos Text Project.

Mortal parents of demigods in classical mythology
Amazons (Greek mythology)